Perkins Crofton (1705-1768) was an Anglican priest in Ireland in the 18th century.

Crofton was  born in Crossmolina and educated at Trinity College, Dublin. He was a Royal Navy Chaplain, he was Archdeacon of Aghadoe from 1728 to 1736.

References

Alumni of Trinity College Dublin
18th-century Irish Anglican priests
Archdeacons of Aghadoe
People from Crossmolina
1705 births
1768 deaths